Ger Rogan (born 1963) is an Irish hurling manager and former dual player. He is a former manager of the Derry senior and under-21 county teams.

Rogan made his first appearances for the Antrim senior hurling 1981 and Gaelic football teams in 1982. He continued with the footballers for five seasons but remained with the hurlers until his retirement after the 1991-92 National League. During his inter-county career he won one All-Ireland "B" winners' medal and three ulster winners' medals.
Rogan won Antrim and Ulster titles in handball at under 18 21 and senior and remains the only player to represent his county At handball hurling and football at senior level in the same season.
At club level Rogan is a one-time Ulster hurling medalist with O'Donovan Rossa. In addition to this he has also won one county hurling championship medals and two county football championship medals.

References

1963 births
Living people
Antrim inter-county hurlers
Antrim inter-county Gaelic footballers
Dual players
Hurling managers
O'Donovan Rossa (Antrim) hurlers
O'Donovan Rossa (Antrim) Gaelic footballers
Ulster inter-provincial hurlers